The Flintstones in Viva Rock Vegas (also known as The Flintstones 2 or The Flintstones 2: Viva Rock Vegas in a working title) is a 2000 American romantic comedy film directed by Brian Levant, written by Jim Cash, Harry Elfont, Deborah Kaplan, and Jack Epps, Jr., and is the prequel to Levant's The Flintstones (1994), based on the 1960–66 animated television series of the same name. It is set before the events of both the series and the first film, showing how Fred and Barney meet Wilma and Betty. The title is a play on the Elvis Presley song, Viva Las Vegas, also used as the title of an MGM musical film.

None of the original cast from the first film reprise their roles in this film. The film stars Mark Addy as Fred Flintstone, Stephen Baldwin as Barney Rubble, Kristen Johnston as Wilma Slaghoople, and Jane Krakowski as Betty O'Shale, replacing John Goodman, Rick Moranis, Elizabeth Perkins, and Rosie O'Donnell respectively. The supporting cast features Joan Collins, Thomas Gibson, Harvey Korman (in his final film performance), and Alan Cumming as both The Great Gazoo and Mick Jagged, a parody of Mick Jagger. William Hanna and Joseph Barbera, who created the original cartoon series, make cameo appearances at the end of the film.

The film was a box office bomb, grossing only $59.5 million against its $83 million budget. Like its predecessor, Viva Rock Vegas also received negative reviews, though some critics considered it an improvement over the first film.

Plot 
Young bachelors and best friends Fred Flintstone and Barney Rubble have recently qualified as crane operators at Slate & Company. Soon to be employed, now they want dates, and a little green alien The Great Gazoo, exiled to Earth by his species, offers to help, although only they can see him. Meanwhile, Wilma Slaghoople wants a normal life and activities, like bowling, though her controlling mother Pearl wants her to marry smooth casino-owner Chip Rockefeller.  After Wilma angrily escapes to Bronto King in Bedrock, waitress Betty O'Shale, mistaking her as "caveless", offers to share her apartment and gets her a job.

Smitten with the waitresses, the two men invite them to a carnival, with Fred dating Betty and Barney taking Wilma. However, the couples do not really connect until both men switch dates. Fred wins an egg in a carnival game which hatches into a baby dinosaur, which he names "Dino". Wilma invites her new friends home to a birthday party for her father, Colonel Slaghoople, where all are shocked by her wealth. Intending to propose, Fred changes his mind after meeting Chip, who berates his low-level job at Slate & Company. Pearl dislikes the three new friends, but the Colonel, glad for Wilma's happiness, accepts them and privately gives Wilma a valuable pearl necklace that his great-grandmother once wore. After the boys disgrace themselves at dinner, Wilma nevertheless proclaims her pride and follows them out.

Chip congratulates Fred on attracting Wilma, apologizes for mocking Fred's job, and invites the group to his Rock Vegas resort as a peace offering. However, unbeknownst to the group, Chip plots to hope Fred gambles so Wilma dumps him, whereas Fred sees it as a chance to win big so he can impress Wilma with money like Chip's. Gangsters Big Rocko and Little Rocko visit Chip and his girlfriend Roxie to collect a lot of money that Chip owes their boss. Gazoo overhears Chip claiming his upcoming marriage to Wilma will allow him to access the Slaghoople fortune. Considering that plan creditable, the gangsters agree to suspend collections until after the wedding. When Barney tries to keep Fred from high-stakes poker, Chip sends Roxie to seduce and escort Barney to an all-you-can-eat buffet.

Chip keeps Fred gambling to miss his dinner date with the others. Betty sees Barney wipe cream from Roxie's chest, misinterpreting the move as a pass. Mick Jagged comforts the weeping girl, and they go on a date. Wilma breaks up with Fred over not spending any time with her. Chip warns her of burglaries and arranges that Fred loses everything before slipping Wilma's pearls in Fred's pocket and asking him to empty them. Hotel security arrests Fred for robbery, but when Barney protests that Fred is incapable of robbery and would not even be able to crack his own knuckles without help, Chip accuses Barney of being Fred's accomplice and also has him arrested. Angered that the two stole from her, Wilma goes back to Chip.

Gazoo visits the men in prison, revealing that Chip is severely indebted to the mob and hopes to solve both his problems by framing Fred for the robbery and marrying Wilma to get the Slaghooples' money. Barney slips through the bars, steals the keys, and unlocks the cell. Disguised in drag as dancers, they accidentally run into Jagged's dressing room. Barney tells Betty he loves her, and they reconcile after the misunderstanding involving Roxie at the buffet is cleared up, and Barney knocks out Jagged.

Fred plans to disguise himself as Jagged in an attempt to reconcile with Wilma. Meanwhile, in the audience, Chip proposes to an unresponsive Wilma. Fred then comes on stage disguised as Jagged and briefly sings to Wilma, apologizing for his behavior earlier before proposing to her. Knowing that she still loves Fred, Wilma happily accepts, rejecting Chip, and they marry in the Rock Vegas Chapel of Love. After the pastor proclaims them husband and wife, everyone sings "Meet the Flintstones". When Jagged sings "Viva Rock Vegas" at a party, Betty catches Wilma's tossed bouquet and kisses Barney. The newlyweds drive away with Dino and Gazoo to goodbye waves from their friends, family, and even a handcuffed Chip and Roxie.

Cast 
 Mark Addy as Fred Flintstone, a crane operator.
 Stephen Baldwin as Barney Rubble, a crane operator and Fred's best friend.
 Kristen Johnston as Wilma Slaghoople, the heir to the Slaghoople fortune and Fred's love interest.
 Jane Krakowski as Betty O'Shale, a waitress at Bronto King and Barney's love interest.
 Thomas Gibson as Chip Rockefeller, a casino owner who falls for Wilma.
 Alan Cumming as The Great Gazoo, an alien who befriends Fred and Barney.
 Alan Cumming also portrays Mick Jagged
 Harvey Korman as Colonel Slaghoople, Wilma's father. Korman previously voiced the Great Gazoo in the original television series and the Dictabird in the first film.
 Joan Collins as Pearl Slaghoople, Wilma's mother.
 Alex Meneses as Roxie, Chip's girlfriend who assists in his plot.
 Tony Longo as Big Rocko, a tough gangster who seeks to collect the money that Chip owes his unnamed boss.
 Danny Woodburn as Little Rocko, a short gangster who seeks to collect the money that Chip owes his unnamed boss.
 John Taylor as Keith Rockhard.
 Irwin Keyes as Joe Rockhead, reprising his role from the first film.
 Taylor Negron as Gazaam and Gazing, aliens from Gazoo's race.
 Mel Blanc (archive footage, voice) as Puppy Dino; Blanc previously voiced Barney, Dino and numerous characters in the original series.
 William Hanna (special appearance) as himself
 Joseph Barbera (special appearance) as himself
 John Stephenson as the Minister who marries Fred and Wilma.
 John Stephenson also voices the Showroom Announcer; Stephenson previously voiced a number of guest characters in the original series, most notably Mr. Slate and Count Rockula.
 Rosie O'Donnell as the voice of the Octopus giving Wilma and Betty massages; O'Donnell previously portrayed Betty in the first film.
 John Cho as Parking valet
 Kristen Stewart as Ring Toss Girl
 Steve Schirripa as Croupier 
 Jim Doughan as Dinosaur Confessor. Doughan previously portrayed a waiter in the first film.

Puppeteers 
 David Barclay (lead)
 Kevin Carlson
 Tom Fisher
 Terri Hardin
 Bruce Lanoil
 Michelan Sisti
 Allan Trautman

Production 

Korman, who played Wilma's father Colonel Slaghoople, voiced The Great Gazoo in the animated series and also voiced the Dictabird in the first film. Stephenson, who played both the Showroom announcer and the Minister, voiced Mr. Slate in the animated series. Krakowski had been reluctant to play Betty, feeling she would be overshadowing O'Donnell, until O'Donnell congratulated her for getting the role with flowers and a card that said "From Betty #1 to Betty #2, Now Yabba Dabba Do It!"

Music 

Ann-Margret, who had a memorable guest appearance on the original animated series as the title character in "Ann-Margrock Presents", sings the theme song, a slightly rewritten version of Viva Las Vegas, incorporating elements from the original TV series theme tune.

Release

Box office 
The Flintstones in Viva Rock Vegas opened theatrically on April 28, 2000, and earned $10,518,435 in its first weekend, ranking second to U-571 second weekend. The film ended its run on August 17, 2000, having grossed $35,268,275 domestically and $24,200,000 overseas for a worldwide total of $59,468,275. Based on an $83 million budget, the film was a box office bomb. This was an extreme disappointment compared to the first film's $358.5 million worldwide gross.

Critical response 
On Rotten Tomatoes, The Flintstones in Viva Rock Vegas has a 25% score, based on 72 reviews, with an average rating of 4/10. The site's critical consensus states: "The prequel to the first full-length feature set in Bedrock, Viva Rock Vegas is a surprising improvement over The Flintstones. Aimed towards an audience of adults and children alike, critics feel Viva will appeal to a broad range of viewers". Metacritic reports a 27 out of 100 rating, based on 26 reviews, indicating "generally unfavorable reviews". Audiences polled by CinemaScore gave the film an average grade of "B+" on an A+ to F scale, the same rating as its predecessor.

Accolades 

The film was nominated for four Razzies at the 21st Golden Raspberry Awards:
 Worst Picture
 Worst Supporting Actor (Stephen Baldwin)
 Worst Supporting Actress (Joan Collins)
 Worst Remake or Sequel

At the 2000 Stinkers Bad Movie Awards, it received seven total nominations with only one win: Worst Resurrection of a TV Show. Its other nominations were for:
 Worst Supporting Actor (Stephen Baldwin)
 Worst Song ("Viva Rock Vegas" by Ann-Margret)
 Worst On-Screen Hairstyle (Stephen Baldwin)
 Worst Remake or Sequel
 The Remake or Sequel Nobody Was Clamoring For
 Most Unfunny Comic Relief (Alan Cumming as The Great Gazoo and Mick Jagged)

See also
 List of films set in Las Vegas

References

External links 

 
 
 
 
 

The Flintstones films
2000 films
American films with live action and animation
2000s science fiction comedy films
2000 romantic comedy films
Amblin Entertainment films
Films about dinosaurs
Films about vacationing
Films about weddings
American children's comedy films
American science fiction comedy films
American romantic comedy films
Films directed by Brian Levant
Puppet films
Live-action films based on animated series
Films scored by David Newman
Hanna-Barbera animated films
Universal Pictures films
2000 animated films
2000s children's animated films
2000s children's comedy films
2000s English-language films
Films produced by Bruce Cohen
2000s American films
American prequel films